The 2008 Tennessee Republican presidential primary took place on February 5, 2008 (Super Tuesday), with 52 national delegates.  Mike Huckabee narrowly defeated John McCain to win the largest share of Tennessee's delegates to the 2008 Republican National Convention.  Both McCain and the third-place candidate Mitt Romney received delegates along with Huckabee.

At of 10:15 PM ET on February 5, the Associated Press reported that with 44% of precincts reporting Huckabee and McCain were tied with about one-third of the vote each. Earlier, with 31% of precincts in, McCain had 34% support, Huckabee 31%, Romney 23% and Paul 6% support.

The City Paper reported that voter turnout could beat the state's record of 830,000 in 1988 when Al Gore was on the presidential ballot for the first time.

AP exit polls showed that Huckabee did well with born-again Christians and conservatives.

Results 

* Candidate dropped out of the race before the primary

See also 

 Republican Party (United States) presidential primaries, 2008
 Tennessee Democratic primary, 2008

References 

Tennessee
2008 Tennessee elections
2008 Super Tuesday
Tennessee Republican primaries